Can Bozdoğan (born 5 April 2001) is a German professional footballer who plays as a midfielder for Eredivisie club Utrecht, on loan from Schalke 04.

Career

Schalke 04 
Bozdoğan made his debut for Schalke 04 in the Bundesliga on 14 June 2020, starting in the home match against Bayer Leverkusen.

Beşiktaş (loan) 
On 27 August 2021, he agreed to join Süper Lig club Beşiktaş on a season-long loan with an option to make the move permanent.

Utrecht (loan) 
On 26 July 2022, he joined Eredivisie club Utrecht, again on a season-long loan with an option to make the move permanent.

Personal life
Born in Germany, Bozdoğan is of Turkish descent.

Career statistics

References

External links
 
 
 
 
 

2001 births
Living people
German footballers
Germany youth international footballers
German people of Turkish descent
Association football midfielders
FC Schalke 04 players
Beşiktaş J.K. footballers
FC Utrecht players
Bundesliga players
Süper Lig players
Eredivisie players
Footballers from Cologne